The Hotel and Restaurant Museum specializes in the history of Finnish hotels, restaurants, cafés, tourism and culinary culture. The museum is located in Kaapelitehdas, Helsinki, Finland. The museum was first opened in 1971 but has operated in its present premises since 1993. The museums collection includes about 20,000 artifacts and other objects from restaurants, bars, diners, spas and hotels. Museum's archives include about 38,000  photographs, menus and other documents. Museum also takes care of the Alko store museum's collection.

Exhibition 

The permanent exhibition presents Finnish food and drink culture, it takes a trip through the history of tourism in Finland and explores the world of restaurant and hotel staff. The exhibition has interiors from 1950's hotel room and kitchen, 1970's bar to 1930's Alko store. There is also alternating exhibition with different topics.

See also 

 List of museums in Finland

References

External links 

 

Museums in Helsinki
History museums in Finland

Museums established in 1971
1971 establishments in Finland